Belanda Bor (Boor) may be,
Balanda Boor people
Belanda Bor language